Günther Edward Arnold Schneider (February 18, 1890 – April 26, 1956) was an American actor of the stage and screen.

Early life
Arnold was born on February 18, 1890, in Lower East Side of New York City, the son of German immigrants Elizabeth (Ohse) and Carl Schneider. His schooling came at the East Side Settlement House.

Acting career

Stage
Arnold was interested in acting ever since he appeared on stage as Lorenzo in The Merchant of Venice at age 12. He made his professional stage debut in 1907 and had important roles in several plays on Broadway in the 1920s and 1930s. Among them is the 1927 revival of The Jazz Singer, with Arnold as the second lead to the star, George Jessel.

Film
He found work as an extra for Essanay Studios and World Studios, before landing his first significant role in 1916's The Misleading Lady. He returned to the stage in 1919, and did not appear in movies again until his talkie debut in Okay America! (1932). He recreated one of his stage roles in one of his early films, Whistling in the Dark (1933). His role in the 1935 film Diamond Jim boosted him to stardom. He reprised the role of Diamond Jim Brady in the 1940 film Lillian Russell. He played a similar role in The Toast of New York (1937), another fictionalized version of real-life business chicanery, for which he was billed above Cary Grant on posters, with his name in much larger letters.

Arnold appeared in over 150 movies. Although he was labeled "box office poison" in 1938 by an exhibitor publication (he shared this dubious distinction with Joan Crawford, Greta Garbo, Marlene Dietrich, Mae West, Fred Astaire and Katharine Hepburn), he never lacked work. Rather than continue in leading man roles, he gave up losing weight and went after character parts instead. He said, "The bigger I got, the better character roles I received." He was so sought-after, he often worked on two pictures at once.

Arnold was expert as rogues and authority figures, and superb at combining the two as powerful villains quietly pulling strings. He was best known for his roles in Come and Get It (1936), Sutter's Gold (1936), the aforementioned The Toast of New York (1937), You Can't Take It with You (1938), Mr. Smith Goes to Washington (1939), Meet John Doe (1941),  and a larger than life star turn as Daniel Webster in  The Devil and Daniel Webster (1941). He was the first to portray Rex Stout's famous detective Nero Wolfe, starring in Meet Nero Wolfe (1936), based on the first novel in the series.

He played blind detective Duncan Maclain in two movies based on the novels by Baynard Kendrick, Eyes in the Night (1942) and The Hidden Eye (1945).

An image of Arnold made a posthumous appearance in the 1984 film Gremlins as the deceased husband (visible in a large framed photograph) of Mrs. Deagle, a character much like the rich, heartless characters Arnold was known for. Director Joe Dante mentioned that they received permission from Arnold's family to use his image.

Radio
From 1947 to 1953, Arnold starred in the ABC radio program Mr. President. He also played a lawyer, Mr. Reynolds, on The Charlotte Greenwood Show. In 1953, he hosted Spotlight Story on the Mutual network.

Television
Arnold hosted Your Star Showcase, "a series of 52 half-hour television dramas ... released by Television Programs of America." It was launched January 1, 1954, and ran in 1950 cities. He co-starred in "Ever Since the Day", an episode of Ford Theatre on NBC.

Personal life
Arnold was married three times: to Harriet Marshall (1917–1927), with whom he had three children—Elizabeth, Jane and William (who had a short movie career as Edward Arnold Jr.); to Olive Emerson (1929–1948), and to Cleo McLain (1951 until his death)

Arnold was president of the Screen Actors Guild from 1940 to 1942. In 1940, his autobiography Lorenzo Goes to Hollywood was published.  He was the co-founder of the I Am an American Foundation.

Starting in the 1940s, Arnold became involved in Republican politics and was mentioned as a possible candidate for the United States Senate. He lost a closely contested election for Los Angeles County Supervisor and said at the time that perhaps actors were not suited to run for political office. 

Arnold supported Thomas Dewey in the 1944 United States presidential election.

Arnold died at his home in Encino, California, at age 66, from a cerebral hemorrhage associated with atrial fibrillation. He was interred in the San Fernando Mission Cemetery.

Recognition
Midwestern University awarded Arnold the honorary degree of Doctor of Letters (D.Litt) on May 24, 1951. He received a star on the Hollywood Walk of Fame at 6225 Hollywood Boulevard in the recording category on February 8, 1960.

Filmography

Radio appearances

References

Further reading
 
 Arnold, Edward (1940). Lorenzo Goes to Hollywood: The Autobiography of Edward Arnold. New York: Liveright.

External links

 
 
 
 
 Edward Arnold at Virtual History

1890 births
1956 deaths
American male film actors
American male silent film actors
American male stage actors
American male radio actors
Male actors from New York City
American people of German descent
Presidents of the Screen Actors Guild
American autobiographers
People from the Lower East Side
People from Greater Los Angeles
Metro-Goldwyn-Mayer contract players
20th-century American male actors
Burials at San Fernando Mission Cemetery
California Republicans
Activists from New York (state)
Activists from California